Jean-Pierre Dorléac is an French costume designer whose work has appeared in film, television, theater, variety, opera and burlesque.

He was nominated at the 53rd Academy Awards in the category of Best Costumes for his work on the film Somewhere in Time.

Additionally he was nominated for eleven Emmy Awards, winning twice for Battlestar Galactica and The Lot. He was also nominated for Quantum Leap five time, along with Mae West, Lily Dale, The Bastard and Tales of the Gold Monkey.

He is also known for films The Blue Lagoon, Heart and Souls, and Beaver among many others.

Examples of his work have been exhibited worldwide: LACMA displayed his costumes for the exhibition and book Hollywood and History: Costume Design in Film as well as the Metropolitan Museum of Art, New York City, La Palais de la Civilization, Montreal, Canada, and La Place Vendome, Paris, France.

He has worked throughout the world, principally in France, Spain, Brazil and Uruguay.

In 2005, Abracadabra Alakazama two-part comic mystery caper was released, and immediately optioned for a motion picture. 
In 2015, The Naked Truth: An Irreverent Chronicle of Delirious Escapades was released. The book details accounts of Hollywood's last gasp for glamour in the 80's after the corporations took over the studios and sold off the massive period collection of one-of-a-kind historic garments in order to make rental money on the facilities in which they were kept. Additionally, it is a straightfoward honest look at such legends as Fred Astaire, Buddy Ebsen, Henry Fonda, Cary Grant, David Hemmings, Louis Jourdan, Patricia Neal, Sarah Miles, Ann Miller, Eleanor Parker, Barbara Rush, Brooke Shields, Susan Strasberg, Lana Turner, Nancy Walker and Mae West.

Selected filmography

Films
 The Great Smokey Roadblock (1978)
 Good Guys Wear Black (1978)
 Battlestar Galactica (1978)
 Buck Rogers in the 25th Century (1979)
 The Blue Lagoon (1980)
 Somewhere in Time (1980)
 National Lampoon's Class Reunion (1982)
 The Boss' Wife (1986)
 The Killing Time (1987)
 Heart and Souls (1993)
 The Only Thrill (1997)
 Leave It to Beaver (1997)
 Walking to the Waterline (1998)
 In Enemy Hands (2004)

Television movies
 The Bastard (1978)
 The Rebels (1979)
 Jacqueline Susann's Valley of the Dolls (1981)
 Twirl (1981)
 Mae West (1982)
 Rooster (1982)
 Rosie: The Rosemary Clooney Story (1982)
 Airwolf (1984)
 The Highwayman (1987)
 For the Very First Time (1991)
 A Burning Passion: The Margaret Mitchell Story (1994)
 An Element of Truth (1995)
 Dead Man's Island (1995)
 Lily Dale (1996)

Television series
 Battlestar Galactica (1978)
 Galactica 1980 (1980)
 The Greatest American Hero (1981)
 Tales of the Gold Monkey (1983)
 Emerald Point N.A.S. (1983)
 Masquerade (1983)
 Automan (1983)
 Knight Rider (1984)
 Airwolf (1984)
 Cover Up (1984)
 Max Headroom (1987)
 Jake and the Fatman (1987)
 Matlock (1988)
 Quantum Leap (1989–91)
 The Lot (2001)

References

External links

French costume designers
Living people
Mass media people from Toulon
Primetime Emmy Award winners
Year of birth missing (living people)